Ka Anoi (English: The Desire) is the debut album by Hawaiian singer Israel Kamakawiwo'ole.

Production
The album includes an upbeat Jawaiian version of Kamakawiwoʻole's popular medley blending "Over the Rainbow" with "What a Wonderful World". This version differs from the highly regarded acoustic rendition, which had been recorded in one take in 1988. The acoustic recording "Somewhere Over the Rainbow/What a Wonderful World" went unreleased prior to the 1993 album Facing Future.

Track listing
"Margarita" – 4:26 (Justin B Fawsitt song)
"Coney Island Washboard Woman" – 2:10
"Kainoa"
"Ka Na‘i Aupuni"
"I'll Be There/Warren's Song" – 4:20
"Men Who Ride Mountains" – 3:21
"Over the Rainbow/What a Wonderful World" – 4:00
"Hanohano O Cowboy" – 2:45
"Sea of Love" – 3:05
"You Don't Know Me" – 4:01

References

External links 
  

Israel Kamakawiwoʻole albums
1990 debut albums